Windsor High School is a public high school located in Windsor, Connecticut. This school serves students from the Town Of Windsor, which is part of Hartford County.

Athletics

Fall 

Cross country 
Field hockey 
Football 
Soccer — boys and girls 
Swimming — girls 
Volleyball — girls 
Cheerleading - boys and girls

Winter 

Basketball — boys and girls 
Ice hockey — boys (Farmington Valley Generals)
Indoor track — boys and girls 
Wrestling — boys 
Cheerleading - boys and girls

Spring 

Baseball 
Golf 
Lacrosse — boys and girls 
Outdoor track — boys and girls 
Softball 
Tennis — boys and girls

References

External links 
 

Windsor, Connecticut
Schools in Hartford County, Connecticut
Public high schools in Connecticut